The Texas garter snake (Thamnophis sirtalis annectens) is a subspecies of the common garter snake (T. sirtalis). The subspecies, which belongs to the subfamily Natricinae of the family Colubridae, is native  to the western United States.

Geographic range
The Texas garter snake is found predominantly in central Texas, with disjunct populations in southwestern Kansas and western Oklahoma.

Habitat
The Texas garter snake is a terrestrial species. It is uncommon, even in its central Texas range, and seldom found in large numbers. It can be found in a wide range of habitats, but is usually close to a water source. It has typically been found in stream-side vegetation or in damp soil near bodies of water. It can be found under objects like old metal or wood, under ground, and in plants.

Description
The Texas garter snake has a greenish-black back with a distinctive bright-orange or red stripe down the center, and yellowish stripes on either side of the body that extend through the second, third, and fourth rows of dorsal scales above the belly plates.

Defense
The Texas garter snake is generally not aggressive, although younger specimens have been known to strike when cornered. If handled, it will often flail about wildly to try to escape and release a foul-smelling musk from its cloaca.

References

Further reading
Behler JL, King FW (1979). The Audubon Society Field Guide to North American Reptiles and Amphibians. New York: Alfred A. Knopf. 743 pp. . ("Thamnophis sirtalis annectans [sic]", p. 674 + Plate 533).
Brown BC (1950). An Annotated Check List of the Reptiles and Amphibians of Texas. Waco, Texas: Baylor University Press. 257 pp. (Thamnophis sirtalis annectens, new subspecies, p. 203).
Powell R, Conant R, Collins JT (2016). Peterson Field Guide to Reptiles and Amphibians of Eastern and Central North America, Fourth Edition. Boston and New York: Houghton Mifflin Harcourt. xiv + 494 pp., 47 plates, 207 figures. . (Thamnophis sirtalis annectens, pp. 432–433 + Plate 43).
Smith HM, Brodie ED Jr (1982). Reptiles of North America: A Guide to Field Identification. New York: Golden Press. 240 pp.  (paperback),  (hardcover). (Thamnophis sirtalis annectens, p. 148).

External links

Thamnophis
Snakes of North America
Reptiles of the United States
Endemic fauna of the United States
Fauna of the Great Plains
Fauna of the Plains-Midwest (United States)
Endemic fauna of Texas
Natural history of Kansas
Natural history of South Dakota